Ode to Labrador is the regional anthem of Labrador, a constituent region of the province of Newfoundland and Labrador, Canada.

History 
Written by Dr. Harry Paddon in 1927, it is generally sung to the melody of O Tannenbaum, although alternate melodies have been proposed. The Ode constitutes "the first major, symbolic declaration of Labradorean solidarity". 

Sent to Labrador by the London board of health, this song is analyzed as Paddon's declaration of allegiance to his fellow adopted countrymen and women, and sought to aid in their political mobilisation with the Ode. The symbolic significance of the Ode is further bolstered by the fact that Labrador's definitive boundaries were only determined that very same year.

Lyrics

See also 

 Ode to Newfoundland
 Symbols of Newfoundland and Labrador

References 

Canadian anthems
Labrador
Patriotic songs
Provincial symbols of Newfoundland and Labrador